François-Marie Delessert (2 April 1780 - 15 October 1868) was a French banker and politician.

Born in Lyon, he was the second son of the banker Étienne Delessert. He studied in Geneva and in 1796 joined the bank Caisse d'Épargne, a banking house founded by his father. Soon he and his elder brother Benjamin were directing the house.

He died in Passy.

Politicians from Lyon
French bankers
Businesspeople from Lyon
1780 births
1868 deaths